The Porto Alegre Book Fair is a book fair held annually, between late October to mid-November, in Porto Alegre, Brazil. It is the biggest open-space book fair in Latin America and the most important cultural event in Porto Alegre. The Porto Alegre Book Fair has been hosted in Porto Alegre downtown since its first edition. Nowadays, the Fair sprawls itself between the Alfândega Square, the Sepúlveda Avenue and some docks at Porto Alegre Harbor.

History
The Porto Alegre Book Fair was an idea from Say Marques, then manager of the Diário de Notícias newspaper. Marques wanted to make books available to the majority of the citizens, as bookshops were deemed to be snobbish. The first edition of the Book Fair had 14 book stands and it was inaugurated on November 16, 1955.

Patrons of the Porto Alegre Book Fair
There is a patron for the Fair since 1965. Selection of the Patron has two phases. In the first phase, each bookshop associated to the Rio-Grandense Book Chamber submits five names. In the second phase, the 10 most voted persons list is submitted to 88 persons arising from the cultural scene. The most voted shall be the Patron of the Porto Alegre Book Fair; in case of tie ballot, the eldest one shall be chosen.

List of Patrons
1965 - Alcides Maya
1966 - João Simões Lopes Neto
1967 - Alceu Wamosy
1968 - Caldas Júnior
1969 - Eduardo Guimaraens
1970 - Augusto Meyer
1971 - Manoelito de Ornellas
1972 - Luís Vaz de Camões
1973 - Darcy Azambuja
1974 - Leopoldo Bernardo Boeck
1975 - Athos Damasceno Ferreira
1976 - Erico Verissimo
1977 - Henrique Bertaso
1978 - Walter Spalding
1979 - Augustin Saint-Hilaire
1980 - Moysés Vellinho
1981 - Adão Juvenal de Souza
1982 - Reynaldo Moura e Monteiro Lobato
1983 - José Bertaso
1984 - Maurício Rosenblatt
1985 - Mario Quintana
1986 - Cyro Martins
1987 - Moacyr Scliar
1988 - Alberto André
1989 - Maria Dinorah
1990 - Guilhermino César
1991 - Luis Fernando Verissimo
1992 - Paulo Fontoura Gastal
1993 - Carlos Reverbel
1994 - Nelson Boeck, Edgardo Xavier, Mário de Almeida Lima e Sétimo Luizelli
1995 - Caio Fernando Abreu
1996 - Lya Luft
1997 - Luiz Antonio de Assis Brasil
1998 - Patrícia Bins
1999 - Décio Freitas
2000 - Barbosa Lessa
2001 - Armindo Trevisan
2002 - Ruy Carlos Ostermann
2003 - Walter Galvani
2004 - Donaldo Schüler
2005 - Friar Rovílio Costa

External links
 Porto Alegre Book Fair website (in Portuguese)

References

Porto Alegre